Julio Cepero Balbíno (born 27 September 1953) is a Cuban footballer. He competed in the men's tournament at the 1976 Summer Olympics.

References

1953 births
Living people
Cuban footballers
Cuba international footballers
Association football midfielders
Olympic footballers of Cuba
Footballers at the 1976 Summer Olympics
Place of birth missing (living people)